Tulshi dam, is an earthfill and gravity dam on Tulshi river in Mumbai near Mulund in the state of Maharashtra in India.

Specifications

Purpose
 Drinking water
 Water supply

See also
 Dams in Maharashtra
 List of reservoirs and dams in India

References

Dams in Mumbai
Dams completed in 1879
1879 establishments in India